University of Management and Technology may refer to:
University of Management and Technology, Lahore, Pakistan
University of Management and Technology, Virginia, United States